"I Need You Tonight" is the second single released from Junior M.A.F.I.A.'s debut album, Conspiracy. The album version featured Faith Evans singing the chorus, while the single version featured Aaliyah singing instead.

Background
The track was produced by DJ Clark Kent, who sampled the Lisa Lisa and Cult Jam song "I Wonder If I Take You Home" and the Patrice Rushen song "Remind Me".

Music video
The music video featured the members and Aaliyah holding a pool party at Kim's house while she flies to Colombia to negotiate a deal with a drug lord. Actor Thomas Mikal Ford of the sitcom Martin also makes a cameo appearance.

Reception
Though "I Need You Tonight" did not find the success of the album's other two singles, it did become a minor hit on three different Billboard charts.

Single track listing

A-side
"I Need You Tonight" (extended radio mix) - 4:27
"I Need You Tonight" (extended dirty version) - 4:27
"I Need You Tonight" (instrumental) - 4:27

B-side
"Murder Onze" (radio version) - 4:21
"Murder Onze" (original version) - 4:21
"Murder Onze" (instrumental) - 4:21

Charts

References

1995 singles
Junior M.A.F.I.A. songs
Aaliyah songs